Donald George Quataert (September 10, 1941 – February 10, 2011) was a historian at Binghamton University. He taught courses on Middle East/Ottoman history, with an interest in labor, social and economics, during the early and modern periods. He also provided training in the reading of Ottoman archival sources.

In 2006, he published an article reviewing Donald Bloxham's book The Great Game of Genocide: Imperialism, Nationalism, and the Destruction of the Ottoman Armenians. In his review, Quataert stated that he used the word genocide because "to do otherwise... runs the risk of suggesting denial of the massive and systematic atrocities" and that "accumulating evidence is indicating that the killings were centrally planned by Ottoman government officials and systematically carried out by their underlings". The review article challenged what Quataert termed "the Ottomanist wall of silence" on the issue.

Weeks later, Quataert resigned from the position of the chairman of the board of directors of the Institute of Turkish Studies, which he had held since 2001. Quataert stated that he was forced to resign due to the pressure of the Turkish ambassador Nabi Şensoy, and a number of other board members resigned shortly thereafter. Mervat Hatem, the director of Middle East Studies Association, sent a letter to the Prime Minister of Turkey Erdogan, criticizing the threats of Turkish officials to stop funding the Institute if Quataert did not retract his statements. Hatem stated that such threats went against academic freedom and that "the resignations are in contradiction with those many requests to leave the discussion and the assessment of the Armenian Genocide to the academia that Turkey has been making."

Books
 The Ottoman Empire, 1700-1922, Cambridge University Press, 2000.
 Ottoman Manufacturing in the Age of the Industrial Revolution, Cambridge University Press, 2002.
 Miners and the State in the Ottoman Empire: The Zonguldak Coalfield, 1822-1920, Berghahn Books, 2006.

See also
Armenian genocide denial

References

1941 births
2011 deaths
Scholars of Ottoman history
Binghamton University faculty
American people of Dutch descent